Gry Wernberg Bay (born 15 August 1974) is a Danish actress. She is best known for her sexually provocative starring role in the feature film All About Anna (2005).

Career 

Gry Bay got her first breakthrough with a recurring part in the German RTL television series Dr. Monika Lindt – Kinderärztin, Geliebte, Mutter (1996), and afterwards appeared in the German TV-movie Hosenflattern (1998).

Back in Denmark, she got her first feature film starring roles in the hip hop comedy Slim Slam Slum a.k.a. Joystick Nation (2002), for which she also composed several of the songs, and in David Noel Bourke's sexy, psychological thriller Last Exit (2003).

She then made headlines by landing the title role in Zentropa's sexually explicit romantic comedy All About Anna (2005), co-produced by Lars von Trier, for which she won the Scandinavian Adult Award as Best-Selling Scandinavian Star of 2006.

At the 2005 Venice Film Festival, Gry Bay once more appeared nude in Pipilotti Rist's video installation Homo sapiens sapiens. She has since appeared in the feature films Betonhjerter (2005) and Grønne hjerter (2006).

In the 1990s, Gry Bay appeared in stage musicals such as West Side Story, Grease, Guys and Dolls, Crazy for You and Me And My Girl, and at Copenhagen's Nørrebros Teater she played the part of Brooke Ashton in Michael Frayn's comedy Noises Off.

She was lead singer in the band XPY, with the remaining members of Crispy following Mette's death.

Personal life 
Bay holds a master's degree in drama and music from University of Copenhagen. She has also studied mediumship and healing (Reiki 3, Eric Pearl, trance).

On 20 December 2009, Bay gave birth to a baby girl.

Selected filmography

References

External links 
 
 
 

1974 births
Living people
People from Frederiksberg
Danish film actresses
Danish television actresses
University of Copenhagen alumni